As of February 2023, there have been 59 amendments to the Constitution of Malaysia since it was first enacted in 1957. The provision to amend the Constitution falls under Article 159. The constitution can be altered through an amendment Act supported by two-thirds of the members of Parliament.

List

References

External links

Federal Constitution as at 1 November 2010

 
Malaysia law-related lists